The Mura is a river in Irkutsk Oblast and Krasnoyarsk Krai, Russia. It is a left tributary of the Angara.

References

Rivers of Krasnoyarsk Krai
Rivers of Irkutsk Oblast
Rivers of Russia